The Seaham Colliery was a coal mine in County Durham in the North of England. The mine suffered an underground explosion in 1880 which resulted in the deaths of upwards of 160 people, including surface workers and rescuers.

Among the dead were 36 non-commissioned officers (NCO)s and men of the 2nd (Seaham) Durham Artillery Volunteer Corps, a part-time unit of the Royal Artillery who were recruited from workers at the mine. They had been commanded by the mine's owner, the Marquess of Londonderry.

Notes

Coal mines in County Durham
1880 mining disasters
1880 in England
Coal mining disasters in England
Seaham